John Edwards (1867–1960) was an English footballer who played in The Football League for Preston North End.

Jack Edwards made his Football League and Club debut on 13 October 1888, playing as a winger, at Deepdale, the home of Preston North End. The visitors were West Bromwich Albion and the home team won 3–0. Edwards also scored his debut club and League goal in this match. Two minutes into the second–half, with the scores at 0–0, Edwards scored from a pass made by his wing–colleague Jack Gordon. Edwards appeared in four of the 22 League matches played by Preston North End in season 1888–89 and scored three League goals. As a forward (one appearance), he played in a Preston forward–line that scored three–League–goals–or–more once. As a winger (three appearances) he played in a Preston midfield that achieved big (three–League–goals–or–more) wins on two separate occasions. He scored three League goals, of which, two came in one match. Edwards, playing as a forward, scored two as his team defeated Notts County 4–1 at Deepdale on 5 January 1889. Despite putting in such a good performance he never played for Preston North end or in a Football League match again.

Nothing is recorded about his career or life after leaving Preston North End. The only recorded fact is that he died in 1960 aged 92/93.

References

English footballers
Preston North End F.C. players
English Football League players
1867 births
1960 deaths
Footballers from Preston, Lancashire
Association football midfielders